Gumti Wildlife Sanctuary is a Wildlife Sanctuary in Tripura, India. It is located in South Tripura region.

It provides habitat for Asian elephant, sambar, water buffalo, deer, Phayre's leaf monkey, serow, wild goat and a few migratory birds. Reptiles have also been sighted in the sanctuary.

One of the landmarks of this sanctuary is lake Dumbur, which attracted around 17 migratory bird species and 126 native bird species in the cold winters, until the number of bird visits has declined significantly in recent years.

Notes

External links
Tripura 

Wildlife sanctuaries in Tripura
Lower Gangetic Plains moist deciduous forests
Protected areas with year of establishment missing